That's What I Say: John Scofield Plays the Music of Ray Charles is a Ray Charles tribute album by John Scofield. Some of the album’s guests include Dr. John, Warren Haynes, John Mayer, Mavis Staples and Aaron Neville. Longtime Charles bandleader David “Fathead” Newman plays tenor saxophone.

Track listing

Personnel
 John Scofield – guitar
 Earl Gardner – trumpet
 Keith O'Quinn – trombone
 Alex Foster – tenor saxophone
 David Newman – tenor saxophone
 Howard Johnson – baritone saxophone
 Larry Goldings – Hammond organ, vibes, Wurlitzer
 Dr. John – piano, vocals
 John Mayer – acoustic guitar, electric guitar, vocals
 Warren Haynes – slide guitar, vocals
 Willie Weeks – double bass
 Steve Jordan – drums, tambourine, background vocals
 Manolo Badrena – percussion, tambourine, timbales, Spanish vocals
 Aaron Neville – vocals
 Mavis Staples – vocals
 Lisa Fischer – background vocals
 Vaneese Thomas – background vocals
 Meegan Voss – background vocals

References 

2005 albums
John Scofield albums
Verve Records albums
Ray Charles tribute albums